Royal Air Force Shipton (more commonly known as RAF Shipton) was a First World War era airfield located north of the village of Shipton-by-Beningbrough, in North Yorkshire, England. During the First World War, it was used by No. 76 Squadron RAF whose remit was to provide Home Defence (HD).
 
The site was utilised by the RAF in the Second World War as a base for No. 60 Maintenance Unit and in the Cold War as a fighter control site for No. 12 Group RAF, and command bunker in case of a nuclear event. The bunker site buildings are still extant, though they were sold into private hands in the 1990s.

History

First World War
RAF Shipton was brought into use in September 1916 as a landing site for No. 76 (Home Defence) Squadron, RAF. No. 76 Squadron had their headquarters at Ripon and like many other of the relief landing grounds they operated, it is unsure whether or not Shipton saw any flying activity. After the Armistice, the RAF disposed of the site in March 1919.

Second World War
It was resurrected in the Second World War as a base for No. 60 Maintenance Unit (originally No. 5 Salvage Unit) who were required to strip everything of scrap value down for components that could be used. They had a remit to recover crashed aircraft as part of their recovery process, and for a while, the guard hut at Shipton was the upturned fuselage of a wrecked aircraft. The area of responsibility that No. 60 MU covered included the North York Moors, the Peak District, and as far north as Blyth in Northumberland when they went to recover a crashed Luftwaffe aircraft from the harbour area. No. 60 MU recovered a crashed Halifax from Whernside which was scattered over a wide area. The crash occurred in December 1943 and the extreme cold and elevated location made the recovery very difficult, but all valuable parts were returned to the main site at Shipton by 6 January 1944. During this time, Shipton was used as a scatter airfield for the Whitley Bombers of No. 58 Squadron from nearby Linton-on-Ouse. The Whitleys were taken there to spread out the number of aircraft across a wider geographical area in case of an enemy raid at Linton.

In 1946, No. 60 MU withdrew from the site and moved to RAF Rufforth, although there is possible evidence that they had a small operation still ongoing at Shipton until 1959, when the headquarters was confirmed as being at RAF Church Fenton.

Cold War
As part of Britains' early warning defence programme (known as ROTOR), a bunker with three levels was built at the north west corner of the airfield site in 1953. Initially, the operations were run from Imphal Barracks in York, but when the bunker was commissioned in 1954, the control was transferred to Shipton. Shipton was one of six Sector Operations Centres (SOCs) dotted around Great Britain, (the other five being at Barnton Quarry in Edinburgh, Bawburgh near Norwich, Box in Wiltshire, Goosnargh near Preston and Kelvedon Hatch in Essex).

The initial role of the SOC was to direct air operations and counter-inception flights in the eastern side of England. Reports were fed into the site from radar stations dotted along the eastern coast of England. As befitting its air defence role, it was the headquarters of the northern sector (No. 12 Group Fighter Command) and was in overall command of 19, 66, 92, 152, 264, 275, 607, 608 and 609 Squadrons spread out between the airfields at Church Fenton, Linton-on-Ouse, Ouston and Thornaby. During this period, some of the staff were drawn from the West Riding numbered Fighter Control Unit, No. 3609 Squadron.

The site itself consisted of the main bunker complex, a guardhouse and a standby living accommodation, though the main living quarters were at the nearby base of RAF Linton-on-Ouse. The site was only the lead SOC for three years before the centre at RAF Boulmer assumed primacy in 1957. During the 1970s, 80s and 90s, the bunker was a Regional Seat of Government (RSG), which later changed to the designation of Regional Government Headquarters (RGHQ). A fourth floor was added in 1976 as part of a five-year refurbishment programme.

A decision was taken in 1992 to sell off some of the nuclear bunkers deemed unnecessary after the end of the Cold War; Shipton was one of them, with closure coming in 1993 and disposal in 1996.

Notes

References

Sources

External links
Diagram of typical bunker layout

Royal Air Force stations in Yorkshire
Buildings and structures in North Yorkshire
Royal Air Force stations of World War II in the United Kingdom
Military units and formations established in 1918
Government buildings completed in 1953
Emergency management in the United Kingdom
Continuity of government
Nuclear bunkers in the United Kingdom